Michael Teig (born 1968), is an American poet and a founding editor of the American literary journal, jubilat.

Born and raised in western Pennsylvania in the City of Franklin, Teig holds a bachelor's degree in English from Oberlin College and a master of fine arts degree in Creative Writing from the University of Massachusetts Amherst.

Teig attended the Kiski School in Saltsburg, Pennsylvania.  Founded in 1888, this all-boys boarding school introduced him to arts.

His first book, Big Back Yard (BOA Editions, 2003), was selected by Stephen Dobyns to receive the inaugural A. Poulin, Jr. Poetry Prize. Teig's poems have appeared in periodicals including FIELD, The Black Warrior Review, Crazyhorse, The Ohio Review, and The Gettysburg Review. He is a founding editor of jubilat, a twice-yearly international poetry journal.

Teig currently (as of late 2006) lives in Easthampton, Massachusetts, where he works as a freelance writer and editor.

Books
 Big Back Yard (A. Poulin, Jr. New Poets of America Series #25, BOA Editions, 2003)
 There's a Box in the Garage You Can Beat With a Stick (American Poets Continuum, BOA Editions, 2013)

Notes

External links
  Tieg's biography page at the Academy of American Poets Web site

1968 births
American male poets
Writers from Northampton, Massachusetts
Oberlin College alumni
University of Massachusetts Amherst MFA Program for Poets & Writers alumni
Living people
21st-century American poets
21st-century American male writers